The Solicitor General of India (SGI) is subordinate to the Attorney General for India. They are the second-highest law officer of the country, assists the Attorney General, and is assisted by Additional Solicitor Generals of India (Addl. SGIs). The SGI and the Addl. SGIs advise the Government and appear on behalf of the Union of India in terms of the Law Officers (Conditions of Service) Rules, 1972. However, unlike the post of Attorney General for India, which is a Constitutional post under Article 76 of the Constitution of India, the posts of the Solicitor General and the Additional Solicitors General are merely statutory. 

Appointments Committee of the Cabinet (ACC) recommends the appointment and officially appoints the Solicitor General. The proposal for appointment of Solicitor General, Additional Solicitor General is generally moved at the level of Joint secretary (or Law Secretary) in the Department of Legal Affairs and after obtaining the approval of the Minister of Law & Justice, the proposal goes to the ACC and then to the president.

Currently, the Solicitor General of India is Tushar Mehta.

Duties
Solicitor general works under The attorney general of India 
Duties of Solicitor General are laid out in Law Officers (Conditions of Service) Rules, 1987:
to give advice to the Government of India upon such legal matters, and to perform such other duties of a legal character, as may from time to time, be referred or assigned to him by the Government of India.
to appear, whenever required, in the Supreme Court or in any High Court on behalf of the Government of India in cases (including suits, writ petitions, appeal and other proceedings) in which the Government of India is concerned as a party or is otherwise interested;
to represent the Government of India in any reference made by the President to the Supreme Court under Article 143 of the Constitution; and
to discharge such other functions as are conferred on a Law Officer by or under the Constitution or any other Law for the time being in force.

Restrictions of private practice
As law officers represent the Government of India, there are certain restrictions which are put on their private practice. A law officer is not allowed to:
hold briefs in any court for any party, except the Government of India or the government of a State or any University, Government School or College, local authority, Public Service Commission, Port Trust, Port Commissioners, Government aided or Government managed hospitals, a Government company, any Corporation owned or controlled by the State, any body or institution in which the Government has a preponderating interest;
advice any party against the Government of India or a Public Sector Undertaking, or in cases in which he is likely to be called upon to advise, or appear for, the Government of India or a Public Sector Undertaking;
defend an accused person in a criminal prosecution, without the permission of the Government of India; or
accept appointment to any office in any company or corporation without the permission of the Government of India;
advise any Ministry or Department of Government of India or any statutory organisation or any Public Sector Undertaking unless the proposal or a reference in this regard is received through the Ministry of Law and Justice, Department of Legal Affairs.

Fee and allowances payable
Fee and allowances payable to the law officers (including Attorney General of India, Solicitor General of India and the Additional Solicitors General) of the Government of India are as under:

In addition to the above fee payable for cases, a retainer fee is paid to the Solicitor General and the Addl. Solicitors General at the rate of Rs. 40,000, and Rs. 30,000 per month, respectively.

List of incumbent Law Officers 
The list of incumbent Law Officers (i.e. AGI, SGI, Addl. SGIs) as of 2 September 2022 are as follows:

List of Solicitor Generals of India 
The Solicitor Generals of India since independence are listed below:

Notes 

 1.Later appointed as the Attorney-General for India.
 2.Later appointed as a judge in the Supreme Court of India.

See also 
Advocate general (India)

References

External links
Official website of Supreme Court of India
List of law officers of India

 
Indian lawyers
Supreme Court of India